Canada Place is a building situated on the Burrard Inlet in Vancouver, British Columbia, Canada. It is home to the Vancouver Convention Centre, the Pan Pacific Vancouver Hotel, the Vancouver World Trade Centre, and the virtual flight ride FlyOver Canada. The building's exterior is covered by fabric roofs resembling sails. It is also the main cruise ship passenger terminal for the region, where cruises to Alaska originate. The building was designed by architects Zeidler Roberts Partnership in joint venture with Musson Cattell Mackey Partnership and DA Architects + Planners.

Canada Place can be reached via the SkyTrain line at the nearby Waterfront Station terminus or via West Cordova Street in Vancouver.

The structure was expanded in 2001 to accommodate another cruise ship berth. In 2009/10, for the 2010 Winter Olympics, Canada Place served as the Main Press Centre.

History

Canada Place was built on the land which was originally the Canadian Pacific Railway's Pier B-C. Built in 1927, its primary purpose was to serve CPR and other shipping lines trading across the Pacific Ocean.

In 1978 Federal, Provincial and Municipal governments commenced planning for development of convention, cruise ship and hotel facilities. Four years later, the Government of Canada created a crown corporation, the Canada Harbour Place Corporation (known as Canada Place Corporation until 2012), to develop the Canada Place project on the Pier B-C site. Construction began when Queen Elizabeth II arrived on the Royal Yacht Britannia with Pierre Trudeau, Prime Minister of Canada and William R. Bennett, Premier of BC to initiate the first concrete pour.

During Expo 86, the Canada Pavilion at Canada Place was opened by Prince Charles and Brian Mulroney, Prime Minister of Canada. Among the largest and most elaborate pavilions presented by any nation at any World's Fair, the Canada Pavilion hosted more than 5 million visitors prior to the October 13, 1986 closing date.

Canada Place Corporation (CPC), a Crown agent, continues to act as the coordinating landlord for Canada Place facilities.

Events
Throughout the year many community events are held at and hosted by Canada Place.

Pan Pacific Vancouver
The Pan Pacific Vancouver opened in January 1986 and has 503 rooms and suites, two restaurants, and a lounge.

The Hotel is operated by Pan Pacific Hotels and Resorts.

Heritage Horns 

The Heritage Horns, formerly known as the 12 O'clock Horn, sound the first four notes of O Canada every day at noon and can be heard throughout Downtown Vancouver and beyond. The ten horns have five facing north and five facing east on the roof of the Pan Pacific hotel and have an output of 115 Decibels. They were originally on the roof of the BC Hydro building (now The Electra) and were silent when the headquarters was converted to condominiums in the early 1990s. The horns started sounding again on November 8, 1994 after being acquired, refurbished, and relocated to Canada Place. Due to complaints, the timer was changed from mechanical to electrical soon after to make them accurate. They sounded 26 times during the 2010 Olympics, once for each medal won by Canada. The first was at 7:30pm on February 13 for a silver won by Jennifer Heil. The Heritage Horns were also sounding at 7:00 p.m. each evening from March 26 to April 16, 2020 in support of essential service workers across Canada. Another notable time signal in the area is the 9 O'Clock Gun across the harbour in Stanley Park.

See also 
 Ballantyne Pier—overflow cruise ship terminal in Vancouver
 CPR Pier B and C
 The Drop (sculpture)
 Expo 86

References

External links

 

1986 establishments in British Columbia
Buildings and structures in Vancouver
Commercial buildings completed in 1986
Eberhard Zeidler buildings
Expo 86
Piers in Canada
Tourist attractions in Vancouver
Transport in Greater Vancouver
World's fair architecture in Vancouver